Choe Myong-hwa (born 11 February 1976) is a North Korean diver. She competed at the 1996 Summer Olympics and the 2000 Summer Olympics.

References

1976 births
Living people
North Korean female divers
Olympic divers of North Korea
Divers at the 1996 Summer Olympics
Divers at the 2000 Summer Olympics
Place of birth missing (living people)
Asian Games medalists in diving
Divers at the 1998 Asian Games
Asian Games bronze medalists for North Korea
Medalists at the 1998 Asian Games
20th-century North Korean women